The 2011–12 season is Blackburn Rovers 124th season as a professional football club. The 2011–12 season is Blackburn Rovers' 18th season in the Premier League, and their 11th consecutive season in the top division of English football.

The club have been confirmed as relegated to the Football League Championship. The decisive result was failure to beat Wigan Athletic F.C. on 7 May 2012. They ended the season at 19th place after losing the last Premier League game 2–1 against Chelsea on 13 May 2012.

Club

Technical staff

  Eric Black (appointed 20 January 2012)

Medical staff

League table

Pre-season friendlies

First Team

Reserves

Mid-season friendlies

 Following the 13 July 2011 Mumbai bombings, Blackburn Rovers postponed this pre-season tour following the advice from the British Foreign office, and this includes the friendly against Pune. The original date of the fixture was 22 July 2011.

Competitions

Premier League

Results by Round

FA Cup

League Cup

Squad statistics

Appearances and goals

|-
|colspan="14"|Players that played for Blackburn Rovers this season that have left the club:

|-
|colspan="14"|Players that played for Blackburn Rovers this season that have been stripped of shirt number:

|}

 Due to clauses in Salgado's contracts regarding an automatic payrise and a one-year extension to his current contract, he was excluded from first team duty.

Top scorers

Disciplinary record

Transfers

Transfers

Summer 2011

In

Total spending:  Undisclosed fee *(rep. minimal fee) £16 million-£18 million + additional undisclosed fees & add-ons

Out

Total income:  Undisclosed fee *(rep. minimal fee) £23.9 million-£29.4 million + Undisclosed fees

Loan out

January transfer window 2012

In

Total spending:  Undisclosed fee *(rep. minimal fee)

Out

Total income:  Undisclosed fee *(rep.£11.5 million)

Loan in

Loan out

References

External links
Blackburn Rovers F.C. official website

2011-12
2011–12 Premier League by team